William Merrill McCormick (February 5, 1892 – August 19, 1953) was an American film actor. He appeared in more than 250 films between 1916 and 1953.

William Merrill McCormick was born on February 5, 1892, in Denver, Colorado.

McCormick appeared in films like The Last Chance (1926) as Black Bart, The Prisoner of Shark Island, Oh, Susanna!, Heroes of the Alamo as one of the Alamo's defenders, Stagecoach, Dodge City, Man of Conquest, Dick Tracy's G-Men, San Antonio, and Buffalo Bill in Tomahawk Territory. His television appearances included The Cisco Kid, The Adventures of Wild Bill Hickok, and The Gene Autry Show.

McCormick died in San Gabriel, California from a heart attack.

Selected filmography

 '49-'17 (1917) - Townsman (uncredited)
 Something New (1920) - Agrilla Gorgez - the Bandit
 Hands Off! (1921) - Tony Alviro
 Red Courage (1921) - Percy Gibbons
 Robin Hood (1922) - Henchman to Prince John
 Danger (1923) - Jose
 Good Men and Bad (1923) - Don Pedro Martinez
 The Dramatic Life of Abraham Lincoln (1924) - Corporal of Guard (as William McCormick)
 Pioneer's Gold (1924) - Pascale
 Range Blood (1924)
 Notch Number One (1924)
 Tonio, Son of the Sierras (1925) - Soldier
 Vic Dyson Pays (1925) - Albert Stacey
 Reckless Courage (1925) - Chuck Carson
 Flashing Steeds (1925) - Lord Algernon Rathburne
 Fangs of Fate (1925) - 'Red Mack' - the Renegade
 The Desperate Game (1926) - Luke Grayson
 The Last Chance (1926) - 'Black' Bart
 The Long Loop on the Pecos (1927)
 Whispering Smith Rides (1927)
 Arizona Nights (1927)
 A Son of the Desert (1928)
 The Apache Raider (1928)
 Romance of the Rio Grande (1929)
 Battling with Buffalo Bill (1931)
 Trails of the Golden West (1931)
 South of the Rio Grande (1932)
 Two-Fisted Law (1932)
 The Three Musketeers (1933)
 Fog (1933)
 The Law of the Wild (1934)
 The New Adventures of Tarzan (1935)
 Winds of the Wasteland (1936)
 Rebellion (1936)
 We're in the Legion Now! (1936)
Tundra (1936)
 Zorro Rides Again (1937)
 Outlaws of Sonora (1938)
 Days of Jesse James (1939)
 Overland Mail (1939)
 The Son of Davy Crockett (1941)
 Tombstone, the Town Too Tough to Die (1942)
 Hitler's Madman (1943)
 They Were Expendable (1945)
 Galloping Thunder (1946)
 I Shot Billy the Kid (1950)
 Santa Fe (1951)
 High Noon (1952) - Fletcher (uncredited)
 Salome (1953)

References

External links

1892 births
1953 deaths
American male film actors
American male silent film actors
20th-century American male actors
Male actors from Denver
Male Western (genre) film actors